Events in the year 1840 in Norway.

Incumbents
Monarch: Charles III John

Events

Arts and literature

Births
3 January – Cathinka Guldberg, Norway's first nurse (d.1919)
14 February – Lars Olsen Skrefsrud, missionary and language researcher in India (d.1910)
30 September – Johan Svendsen, composer, conductor and violinist (d.1911)
7 November – H. G. Haugan, Norwegian-born American railroad executive.

Full date unknown
Karl Akre, politician
Anton Christian Bang, politician (d.1913)
Hans Laurits Olsen Hammerstad, politician
Anders Sveaas, businessperson and consul (d.1917)

Deaths
28 August – Caspar Peter Hagerup, civil servant (b.1777)

Full date unknown
Even Hansen, civil servant and politician (born 1790)
Mads Lauritz Madsen, politician (born 1782)
Peder Paulsen Balke, farmer and politician (born 1779).

See also

References